Autódromo Internacional de Santa Cruz do Sul is a  motorsports circuit located in Santa Cruz do Sul, Rio Grande do Sul. It has been host to the Formula 3 Sudamericana, Fórmula Truck and Stock Car Brasil series.
Inaugurated on 12 June 2005, the track has received entries from almost all major categories of Brazil. It also hosted the Brazilian Formula Three Championship.

Lap records

The official fastest lap records at the Autódromo Internacional de Santa Cruz do Sul are listed as:

External links

 Map and circuit history at RacingCircuits.info

References

Motorsport venues in Rio Grande do Sul